
Environmental issue in the European Union include the environmental issues identified by the European Union as well as its constituent states. The European Union has several federal bodies which create policy and practice across the constituent states.

Issues

Air pollution
A report from the European Environment Agency shows that road transport remains Europe's single largest air polluter.

National Emission Ceilings (NEC) for certain atmospheric pollutants are regulated by NECD Directive 2001/81/EC (NECD). As part of the preparatory work associated with the revision of the NECD, the European Commission is assisted by the NECPI working group (National Emission Ceilings – Policy Instruments).

Directive 2008/50/EC of the European Parliament and of the Council of 21 May 2008 on ambient air quality and cleaner air for Europe (the new Air Quality Directive) has entered into force on 11 June 2008.

Individual citizens can force their local councils to tackle air pollution, following an important ruling in July 2009 from the European Court of Justice (ECJ). The EU's court was asked to judge the case of a resident of Munich, Dieter Janecek, who said that under the 1996 EU Air Quality Directive (Council Directive 96/62/EC of 27 September 1996 on
ambient air quality assessment and management ) the Munich authorities were obliged to take action to stop pollution  exceeding specified targets. Janecek then took his case to the ECJ, whose judges said European citizens are entitled to demand air quality action plans from local authorities in situations where there is a risk that EU limits will be overshot.

Legislation

Climate change

Protected areas

Policy

Renewable energy

European Green Deal

Pesticides

Invasive species

Government organizations

EEA

Climate Programme

Directorate General

By state

See also
Bonn Agreement
Coordination of Information on the Environment
Directorate-General for the Environment (European Commission)
European Commissioner for the Environment
European Federation for Transport and Environment
European Week for Waste Reduction (EWWR)

References

External links
Environment at EUROPA, the portal site of the European Union
European Commission - Nature and Biodiversity
recyclingportal.eu